

First round selections

The following are the first round picks in the 1976 Major League Baseball draft.

* Did not sign

Other notable Selections

* Did not sign

Background 
The 1976 Arizona State University team, considered by many to be the best collegiate team ever, played a major role in the draft. Floyd Bannister was picked number one by the Astros while Ken Landreaux was selected sixth by the Angels. In all, 12 players from that team went on to play in the majors.

Bannister and Landreaux anchored a June draft that was one of the most talented ever. The first 10 selections went on to play in the big leagues. Among those picked in the June draft were Rickey Henderson (Oakland), Alan Trammell, Jack Morris and Dan Petry (Detroit), Wade Boggs and Bruce Hurst (Boston), Steve Trout (Chicago White Sox), Leon Durham (St. Louis), and Pat Tabler (New York Yankees).

Willie McGee (Chicago White Sox) and Ozzie Smith (Detroit) were selected in the seventh round but did not sign.
In the January phase, Steve Kemp of Southern California was picked first by the Tigers and Jody Davis was picked third by the Mets.

Notes

External links 
Complete draft list from The Baseball Cube database

References 

Major League Baseball draft
Draft
Major League Baseball draft